Bucculatrix cretica is a moth in the family Bucculatricidae. It was described by G. Deschka in 1991. It is found on Crete.

The length of the forewings is about 3.5 mm. The forewings are whitish with ochreous markings. The hindwings are white.

References

Natural History Museum Lepidoptera generic names catalog

Bucculatricidae
Moths described in 1991
Moths of Europe